Jade Kindar-Martin (born February 16, 1974) is a highwire walker and circus performer.

Kindar-Martin started performing on the wire at the age of 14 with Circus Smirkus, a youth circus based in Vermont, USA. Following his graduation from Champlain Valley Union High School in 1992, he went on to further his studies in the circus arts in Montreal, Quebec, Canada at the Ecole Nationale de Cirque and then at the Centre National des Arts du Cirque in Châlons-en-Champagne, France.  Kindar-Martin there came under the tutelage and mentorship of highwire artist Rudy Omankowski Jr. and began his partnership with Didier Pasquette.

Together, Kindar-Martin and Pasquette soon began touring worldwide, as well as performing their own brand of highwire theatre as part of the Camion Funambule. In the six years they performed together, the two became known equally for their highly technical bicycle acrobatics and dramatic skywalks, including their Guinness World Record-setting double skywalk across the River Thames in London in 1997.

In 1999, Kindar-Martin was recruited by Cirque du Soleil for a new show, La Nouba, in Orlando, Florida, where he performed until January 2004.

In the summer of 2004, Jade married fellow Cirque du Soleil performer and stunt woman Karine Mauffrey, high up in the air on a wire stretched over the grounds of the Château de Chantilly in Chantilly, France. Kindar-Martin and his wife now split their time between Los Angeles, USA and their home in the south of France.

In the summer of 2005, Jade joined The Flying Wallendas, the world-famous highwire family, and performs regularly with them in the "Seven-Man Pyramid" (pictured).

In May, 2007 in Seoul, Korea, Kindar-Martin competed in the First World Highwire Championships.  Kindar-Martin, along with 18 other highwire walkers from around the world, competed for the fastest crossing of the kilometer-long wire over the Han River.  With a time of 0:11:35.54, Kindar-Martin won the bronze medal, 13 seconds behind first place. In completing the walk, all who made it across now also share a new Guinness World Record for longest highwire walk. A longer skywalk may have been accomplished by Rudy Omankowski Jr., Kindar-Martin's mentor.

In 2022, Kindar-Martin took place on AGT: Extreme where he finished as a Grand Finalist.

External links 
VIDEO. Le Quai a largué les amarres 

1973 births
Living people
American circus performers
Tightrope walkers